Wu Yubiao (born January 18, 1975) is a Chinese sprint canoer who competed in the mid-1990s. At the 1996 Summer Olympics in Atlanta, he was eliminated in the repechages of both the K-2 500 m and the K-2 1000 m events.

References

Sports-Reference.com profile

1975 births
Canoeists at the 1996 Summer Olympics
Chinese male canoeists
Living people
Olympic canoeists of China